The Golden Gate Derby was an American Thoroughbred horse race run early each year at Golden Gate Fields set at a distance of one and one sixteenth of a mile.  The Derby was open to three-year-olds.

The Race was run in 1948, 1952, and from 1993 to 2005.

Winners of the Golden Gate Derby thru 2005

Earlier winners
2000 - New Advantage
1999 - Epic Honor
1998 - Clover Hunter
1997 - Pacificbounty
1996 - Halo Sunshine
1995 - Jumron
1994 - Bai Brun 
1993 - Charging North 
1952 - Marcador
1948 - Henpecker

References
 The Golden Gate Derby at Pedigree Query

Horse races in California
Golden Gate Fields
Graded stakes races in the United States